Too Dead For Me EP is an EP by Atari Teenage Riot released in 1999 on CD and as a 12" vinyl record to promote their album 60 Second Wipe Out, where the title track originated. 

"Revolution Action (Live In San Francisco)/[Noise#3]" and "No Remorse [Live In New York 1999]/[Noise #1]" were both re-released on Redefine the Enemy - Rarities and B-Side Compilation 1992-1999, in their entirety but the titles were truncated, removing the words "[Noise #3]" and "[Noise #1]". "Death Of A President DIY [Acapella]" was also re-released on Redefine the Enemy - Rarities and B-Side Compilation 1992-1999.

Track listing

Personnel
 Alec Empire – production, performance
 Hanin Elias – performance
 Nic Endo – performance
 Carl Crack – performance
 Steve Rooke – mastering

External links
discogs.com CD entry
discogs.com 12" vinyl entry

Atari Teenage Riot albums
1999 EPs